Pike is a variety of potato bred by the Cornell and Pennsylvania Experimental Stations in March 1996. This clone originated from a cross made in 1981, between 'Allegany' and 'Atlantic potato' varieties. It is resistant to infection by golden nematode, common scab, golden necrosis, and foliage infection by Phytophthora. Pike is intended to be used agriculturally, specifically for use in potato chips.

Botanical features
 Specific gravity comparable to 'Atlantic' 
 Produce light-colored chips after  storage
 Full season variety
 Tubers are skin color with flaky surface
 Tuber shape is round
 Plants are medium height
 Leaves are medium green
 Three pairs per leaf for leaflets
 Anthers are orange, broad cone

References

Potato cultivars